A fractal catalytic model is a mathematical representation of chemical catalysis in an environment with fractal characteristics.

References 

Fractals
Catalysis